Logan Conrad Mader (born November 16, 1970) is a Canadian record producer and current guitarist of melodic death metal band Once Human, as well as the former lead guitarist of groove metal band Machine Head.

Mader is most famous for his time in Machine Head, whose 1994 debut Burn My Eyes was released by Roadrunner Records and quickly became the top-selling debut album in the label's history until Slipknot's debut album. Their second album, The More Things Change..., was released in 1997 and Logan left the band shortly thereafter to divert his energy and time to side projects.

Mader co-founded Dirty Icon Productions, a Los Angeles-based production team. They write, produce, record, mix, master, and engineer music for other artists.

Biography

Machine Head, Soulfly and Medication
Machine Head formed on October 12, 1991, with Mader on lead guitar, Robb Flynn on vocals and rhythm guitar, Adam Duce on bass and Tony Costanza on drums. He played with Machine Head through two albums until early 1998. After Mader's six-year run with the band, he joined Soulfly where he filled the slot as guitarist for their 1998 world tour. Mader's union with Soulfly was short-lived (8 months) and the only track he technically recorded with them was one of the remixes for Quilombo. Wanting to once again pursue his own projects, Mader left Soulfly in January 1999.

Post Soulfly, Mader formed Los Angeles rock band Medication with Whitfield Crane (formerly of Ugly Kid Joe). Due to a series of internal issues, Medication disbanded in February 2003.

Stereo Black and production 
In June, 2003, Mader formed the band New Black, which was later renamed to Stereo Black. Although the band opened for Tesla and Hed PE, made a demo co-produced by Junkie XL, and created an Internet buzz, they were never signed to a label.

The song Inside (previously titled Save Me) was featured in the commercial for Max Payne, the trailer for The Butterfly Effect 2, and in the movie Never Back Down 2: The Beatdown. The instrumental of the song Fall Again is featured in MotoGP '07 soundtrack. The song Denial is featured in Scream 4 soundtrack.

In 2017, Mader dismissed Stereo Black as "just a studio project" that started for the purpose of sync licensing. After having some success with that, members tried to turn it into a band, but then he realized he wanted to become a full-time producer instead.

Return to live music and further production work
Mader announced his new project, Once Human, in May 2015, which features newcomers Lauren Hart (vocals), Damian Rainauld (bass) and Ralph Alexander (drums). The group signed to earMUSIC and released their debut album, The Life I Remember, in September 2015.

In August and September 2015, they toured the southern, midwestern and southwestern United States with Fear Factory, The Bloodline and Before the Mourning.

Mader mixed and mastered Melancholia, the debut single by French metal band ÆMBER, which was released in November 2018.

In March 2019, it was announced that Mader (along with drummer Chris Kontos) would perform with Machine Head for the first time in 21 years with a tour celebrating the 25th anniversary of the release of Burn My Eyes; however, he and Kontos did not officially rejoin the band.

Discography 
With Machine Head
Burn My Eyes (1994)
The More Things Change... (1997)
Live at Dynamo Open Air 1997 (2019) – archive live album
My Hands Are Empty (2020) – standalone single

With Soulfly
Soulfly Digipak (1998) – appears on "Quilombo (Extreme Ragga Dub Remix)"
Tribe (1999)
Live at Dynamo Open Air 1998 (2018) – archive live album

With Medication
Medication (EP, 2002)
Prince Valium (2002)

With Stereo Black
Stereo Black (Demo) (2005)

With Once Human
 The Life I Remember (2015)
 Evolution (2017)
 Scar Weaver (2022)

Guest appearances
Roadrunner United – The All-Star Sessions (2005)
Jamie Christopherson – Metal Gear Rising: Revengeance soundtrack (2013)
Tina Guo – Cello Metal (2015)

Albums produced 

 K-Again – Memories of an Evolution EP (2003)
 FM Revolver – Leaving Madeira (2005)
 Media Lab – Bleeding Memory (2005)
 Contra – This Machine Kills (2005)
 So Abused " Community Service" (2005)
 Silent Civilian – Rebirth of the Temple (2006)
 Twin Method – The Volume of Self (2006)
 Cloud Nine – Quick as Lightning (2006)
 Five Finger Death Punch – The Way of the Fist (2007) – mixing and mastering
 Dommin – Mend Your Misery (2007)
 Divine Heresy – Bleed the Fifth (2007), Bringer of Plagues (2009)
 W.A.S.P. – Dominator (2007) – mixing and mastering
 Cavalera Conspiracy – Inflikted (2008), Blunt Force Trauma (2011)
 Gojira – The Way of All Flesh (2008) – engineered drums, mixed & mastered album
 Psycroptic – Ob(Servant) (2008)
 Hamlet – La Puta y el Diablo (2009) – mixing and mastering
 Achozen – Achozen (2009)
 Echoes of Eternity – As Shadows Burn (2009)
 AIZEN – Winter in Hell (2009)
 Devildriver – Pray for Villains (2009)
 Incite – The Slaughter (2009)
 W.A.S.P. – Babylon (2009) – mixing and mastering
 The Changing – For Obvious Reasons (2010)
 Soulfly – Omen (2010)
 Bonded by Blood – The Aftermath (2011)
 Channel Zero – Feed 'Em with a Brick (2011)
 Closure – The Silent Witness March (2011)
 Gojira – Sea Shepherd EP (2011)
 Fear Factory – The Industrialist (2012)
 Tensions Arise –  Stand in Defiance (2012)
 Incite – All Out War (2012)
 Dagoba – "Post Mortem Nihil Est" (2013)
 Devil You Know – The Beauty of Destruction (2014)
 Septicflesh – Titan (2014)
 Black Bomb A – "Comfortable Hate" (2015)
 Overunit Machine – "Aldaraja" (2016)
 KHEPRA – "Cosmology Divine" (2016)
 Invidia – "As the Sun Sleeps" (2017)

References

External links 

1970 births
21st-century Canadian guitarists
21st-century Canadian male musicians
Anglophone Quebec people
Canadian heavy metal guitarists
Canadian male guitarists
Canadian record producers
Canadian rock guitarists
Lead guitarists
Living people
Machine Head (band) members
Musicians from Montreal
Soulfly members